The Rivière du Lac Onésime is a tributary of the Saguenay River, flowing in the city of Saguenay (city), in the administrative region of Saguenay–Lac-Saint-Jean, in the province of Quebec, in Canada.

The Lac Onésime river valley is served by Wilbrod Road, Saint-André Road and Montée Duperré, mainly for the needs of forestry and agriculture.

Agriculture is the main economic activity in the Onésime lake river area; forestry, second.

The surface of the Lac Onésime river is usually frozen from the beginning of December to the end of March, however the safe circulation on the ice is generally made from mid-December to mid-March.

Geography 
The main watersheds neighboring the "rivière du Lac Onésime" are:
 north side: Saguenay River;
 east side: Savane brook, rivière aux Sables, Chicoutimi River;
 south side: Dorval River, Potvin lake, Charnois lake, Cascouia River, Kenogami Lake;
 west side: Dupéré stream, Dorval River, Bédard River, Rouge stream, Lac Saint-Jean.

The Lac Onésime river rises at Lac Onésime in the municipality of Larouche . The course of this stream couples Saint-Wilbrod Road and Saint-André Road.

The course of the river Onésime flows into the bottom of Anse à Brillant on the south bank of the Saguenay River. This confluence is located at:
  south of the north shore of the Saguenay River;
  north of route 170;
  downstream of the confluence of the Dorval and Saguenay rivers;
  north-west of Jonquière town center;
  east of downtown Alma.

Toponymy 
The term "Onésime" is a first name of French origin.

The toponym “Rivière du Lac Onésime” was formalized on August 28, 1980, at the Place Names Bank of the Commission de toponymie du Québec.

Notes and references

Appendices

Related articles 
 Saguenay (city), a city
 Saguenay River
 List of rivers of Quebec

Rivers of Saguenay–Lac-Saint-Jean
Geography of Saguenay, Quebec